Shiv Khera is an Indian author, activist and motivational speaker, best known for his book, You Can Win. He launched a movement against caste-based reservation in India, founded an organization called Country First Foundation

Early life
Khera was born in a business oriented family that operated coal mines, which were eventually nationalized by the Indian government. In his early years, he worked as a car washer, a life insurance agent, and a franchise operator before becoming a motivational speaker. While working in the United States, he was inspired by a lecture delivered by Norman Vincent Peale and claims to follow Peale's motivational teachings.

When Freedom Is Not Free was published, Amrit Lal, a retired Indian civil servant, accused Khera of plagiarism, alleging that content from that book directly came from his own book India Enough Is Enough, published 8 years earlier. Additionally, he found that numerous anecdotes, jokes and quotes in Khera's other books were also used without acknowledging proper sources. Khera countered that he took notes and inspirations from numerous sources, and that he was unable to keep track of all of them. Lal finally accepted an out-of-court settlement for an undisclosed sum of money (reputed to be 25 lakh according to Khera), which he said he would donate to the Missionaries of Charity.

Activism and politics
Khera founded Country First Foundation, a social activism organisation whose mission is "to ensure freedom through education and justice". In 2004, he stood as an independent candidate from the South Delhi constituency in Indian general elections and "lost badly". In 2008, he started the Bharatiya Rashtravadi Samanata Party. During 2014 polls in India, he supported the Bhartiya Janata Party and campaigned for Lal Krishna Advani, a senior member of the party. Khera has also filed several public interest lawsuits in the Indian Supreme Court, and he unsuccessfully contested the 2009 general election in India on an anti-corruption platform.

Shiv Khera was one of the speakers in Bhagavad Gita Summit (from 10th - 14th December 2021) during Gita Jayanti at Dallas, Texas, US along with other notable personalities such as Swami Mukundananda Ji, Dr. Menas Kafatos, Kiran Bedi, Brahmacharini Gloria Arieira and others.

Books 
You Can Win: Empower Yourself And Grow

You Can Achieve More: Become Unstoppable And Achieve More
Winners don't do different things;they do things differently

You Can Sell: Grow By Mastering The Art Of Selling With Integrity

See also
 List of Indian writers

References

External links
 Official website

Living people
Indian self-help writers
Indian business speakers
People from Dhanbad district
Activists from Jharkhand
Writers from Jharkhand
Indian motivational speakers
1951 births